Second Nature is the fourth studio album by American indie pop band Lucius. It was released on April 8, 2022 by Mom + Pop Music. It is their first full-length studio album since Good Grief (2016). Second Nature was produced by Dave Cobb and Brandi Carlile.

Background
Lucius' previous studio album Good Grief was released in March 2016, followed by a compilation album in 2018 titled Nudes which consisted of acoustic versions of previously released songs in addition to new material. The band initially worked on an album self-described by band member Holly Laessig as "super heady [and] super conceptual" before shelving it in favor of what would eventually become Second Nature.

Work for the album began shortly prior to lockdowns stemming from the COVID-19 pandemic with sessions beginning in Nashville, Tennessee that saw Lucius collaborate with outside writers for the first time such as Trent Dabbs and Lori McKenna. Sessions continued in Los Angeles virtually via Zoom before the band returned to Nashville for three weeks to complete the album at RCA Studios A.

On January 11, 2022, Lucius announced details about the album, revealing its title Second Nature and its release date of April 8, 2022 with production helmed by Dave Cobb and Brandi Carlile. In a press release, Lucius member Jess Wolfe stated that the album derived from the personal experiences of grief that her and the rest of the band experienced during the pandemic, further adding that the album's musical direction was intended for the band to "[dance their] way through the darkness".

Singles
The album's lead single "Next to Normal" was released simultaneously with the album announcement on January 11, 2022. Three additional singles were released prior to the album's release: "White Lies", "Heartbursts", and "Dance Around It" on February 10, March 3, and March 17 of the same year, respectively.

Critical reception

Upon release, Second Nature received positive acclaim from critics. At Metacritic, which assigns a normalized rating out of 100 based on reviews from mainstream publications, the album has an average score of 74 based on seven reviews, indicating "generally favorable reviews".

Track listing

Personnel
Credits for Second Nature adapted from Tidal.

Musicians
 Holly Laessig - composer, lyricist
 Jess Wolfe - composer, lyricist
 Brandi Carlile - additional vocals (5)
 Sheryl Crow - additional vocals (5)
 Jenn Decilveo - composer (5, 8, 10)
 Trent Dabbs - composer, lyricist (6-7, 9)
 Lori McKenna - composer, lyricist (9)

Technical

 Rob Kinelski - mixing (1-3, 6-8, 10)
 Dan Molad - mixing (4, 5, 9), engineering
 Randy Merrill - engineering, mastering
 Drew Long - engineering
 Greg Koller - engineering
 Brandon Bell - engineering
 Casey Cuayo - mixing engineering
 Eli Heister - mixing engineering
 Phillip Smith - assistant engineering
 Gabriel Cabezas - string engineering
 Rob Moose - string engineering
 Andrew Brightman - production manager
 Michael Goldstone - A&R
 Robert Beatty - artwork, design
 Holly Laessig - creative design
 Jon Conrad - creative design
 Jess Wolfe - creative director
 Sonia Gauvin - design
 Max Wanger - photography

References

2022 albums
Albums produced by Dave Cobb
Albums impacted by the COVID-19 pandemic
Lucius (band) albums